Spencer Tracy (1900–1967) was an American actor. His film career began in 1930, with Humphrey Bogart in Up the River, and ended in 1967 with Katharine Hepburn in Guess Who's Coming to Dinner. Within this 37-year career, Tracy starred in 75 feature films and several short films.

Filmography

Box office ranking
For a number of years exhibitors voted Tracy among the most popular stars in the country:
1937 - 18th (US)
1938 - 5th (US), 3rd (UK)
1939 - 3rd (US), 6th (UK)
1940 - 2nd (US), 3rd (UK)
1941 - 5th (US), 3rd (UK)
1942 - 10th (US), 3rd (UK)
1943 - 19th (US)
1944 - 5th (US), 9th (UK)
1945 - 5th (US), 7th (UK)
1946 - 21st (US)
1947 - 14th (US)
1948 - 9th (US)
1949 - 24th (US)
1950 - 9th (US)
1951 - 10th (US)

See also
List of awards and nominations received by Spencer Tracy

References

Tracy, Spencer
Tracy, Spencer